The men's 5000 metres walk event  at the 1982 European Athletics Indoor Championships was held on 7 March.

Results

References

Racewalking at the European Athletics Indoor Championships
5000